IHK may refer to:

 Association of German Chambers of Industry and Commerce, Industrie- und Handelskammer, German chamber of commerce
 Engineering College of Copenhagen (Ingeniørhøjskolen i København)
 International Hospital Kampala
  (Finnish: Itä-Helsingin Kiekko), a Finnish ice hockey club in East Helsinki